The tsuri-daiko (kanji: 釣り太鼓; also called gaku-daiko (kanji: 楽太鼓)) is a large Japanese hanging drum. It is played with two mallets on one side only. It is used primarily in bugaku orchestra.

Video
Tsuri-Daiko Video

References 

Drums
Membranophones
Japanese musical instruments